The Monastery of Lešok is a monastery, near the village of Lešok in Tearce Municipality, North Macedonia.  It is located close to the border with Kosovo. Lying at 638 metres above sea level it is located on the southeastern side of the mountain Šar Planina. In its complex are the churches of St. Athanasius of Alexandria and the Holy Mother of God Church. The Church of the Holy Virgin, built in 1326, is an excellent example of Byzantine style and architectural tradition. The church has three layers of frescoes. The 1st and bottom layer is from the first time of construction, the second and middle one was added sometime in the 17th century, and the third and top layer was added in 1879. Several marble columns from the original church can still be seen in the Tetovo museum. The monastery dormitories were redecorated from around 1818 and the library was founded and Lešok became a literature and educational center. 

The church of St. Athanasius was built in 1924 next to the Church of the Holy Mother of God. In the yard of the Monastery of Lešok is the tomb of the Bulgarian cleric, writer and enlightener Kiril Peychinovich, who was born in 1770. In his honor, this monastery hosts an International Meeting of Literary Translators. Tetovo is also a host to the Festival of the Macedonian Choirs.

Today the monastery dormitories have been restored and are used to accommodate summer tourists.

References

Eastern Orthodox monasteries in North Macedonia
Macedonian Orthodox monasteries
Medieval Serbian Orthodox monasteries
Šar Mountains
1326 establishments in Europe
Tearce Municipality